The Rugby Football Union Northern Division is the rugby union governing body for the North of England and is part of the Rugby Football Union.

Constituent Bodies

Cheshire
Cumbria
Durham County
Lancashire
Northumberland
Yorkshire

Leagues
It organises the following leagues:

North Premier (tier 5)
North 1 East (6)
North 1 West (6)
Lancs/Cheshire 1 (7)
Lancs/Cheshire 2 (8)
Lancs/Cheshire 3 (9)
Cumbria 1 (7)
Cumbria 2 (8)
Durham/Northumberland 1 (7)
Durham/Northumberland 2 (8)
Durham/Northumberland 3 (9)
Yorkshire 1 (7)
Yorkshire 2 (8)
Yorkshire 3 (9)
Yorkshire 4 (10)

Cups
Clubs also take part in the following national cup competitions:
RFU Intermediate Cup
RFU Senior Vase
RFU Junior Vase

See also
London & SE Division
Midland Division
South West Division
English rugby union system

References

External links
RFU North

Northern